Pilot, also known as PilOt is a Russian rock band from Saint Petersburg, founded by Ilja Knabengof in 1997.

History
The roots of the band stretch back to 1994, at which point it was called Military Jane. In this incarnation, the band had a raw, melodic grunge style reminiscent of Alice In Chains, and featured Knabengof singing in English. Military Jane released three albums, "Home" (1995) "Home Live '95", and "Blackest Paint Colored Brush" (1996) with limited success. The band's single "Wherry?" although popular, was met with controversy and the music video was banned from MTV. During the "Rock '96" festival in Saint Petersburg, the band performed a new song "Мама" (Mama) for the first time. The style of the song took on a contrasting pop direction, with Knabengof finding an original singing voice. The next year, Military Jane's name was changed to Pilot.

In February 1999, the band launch its first official website.

In April and May 2022, Pilot participated in a series of concerts organized in order to support the 2022 Russian invasion of Ukraine.

Members

Current line-up
Ilya "Chort" Knabengof (Илья "Чёрт" Кнабенгоф): vocals, guitar
Sergey Vyrvich: bass guitar
Nikita Belozyorov: drums
Andrey Kazachenko: keyboards

Former members
Vitktor Kuzmichev: drums (1997-1999)
Roman Chujkov: guitars (1997-2005, died in 2013)
Denis Mojin: drums (1999-2000)
Maks Jorik: violin, keyboards, percussion (1999-2007)
Viktor Bastrakov: guitar (2006-2014, died in 2014)
Stanislav Markov: bass guitar (1997-2013)
Nikolaj Lysov: drums (2000-2013)

Discography

Albums

Singles

References

External links
 Official Website
 Unofficial Website
 Funsite
 MySpace
 Official Website of Макс Йорик
 Живой Журнал

Musical groups from Saint Petersburg
Russian rock music groups
Musical groups established in 1997